
The following is a list of the species of grasshopper, cricket and allied insects recorded from Britain. The insect orders covered by this list are:
 the Orthoptera - Grasshoppers and crickets
 the Dermaptera - earwigs
 the Blattodea - cockroaches

This article lists the native species only. A number of other species have been found in the wild as vagrants or accidental introductions.  Many of the Orthopteran common names were synthesised from older sources or coined where necessary by Dr. DR Ragge.

Order Orthoptera (grasshoppers and crickets)

Suborder Ensifera (crickets)

Family Tettigoniidae (bush-crickets) 
 Oak bush-cricket Meconema thalassinum
 Southern oak bush-cricket Meconema meridionale (since 2001)
 Great green bush-cricket Tettigonia viridissima
 Wart-biter Decticus verrucivorus
 Dark bush-cricket Pholidoptera griseoaptera
 Grey bush-cricket Platycleis albopunctata
 Bog bush-cricket Metrioptera brachyptera
 Roesel's bush-cricket Roeseliana roeselii
 Long-winged conehead Conocephalus fuscus
 Short-winged Conehead Conocephalus dorsalis
 Speckled bush-cricket Leptophyes punctatissima

Super-family Grylloidea 
Family Gryllidae
 House cricket Acheta domesticus
 Field cricket Gryllus campestris
Family Mogoplistidae
 Scaly cricket Pseudomogoplistes squamiger
Family Trigonidiidae
 Wood cricket Nemobius sylvestris

Family Gryllotalpidae (mole-crickets) 
 Mole cricket Gryllotalpa gryllotalpa

Suborder Caelifera (grasshoppers & allies)

Family Tetrigidae (groundhoppers) 
 Cepero's groundhopper Tetrix ceperoi
 Slender groundhopper Tetrix subulata
 Common groundhopper Tetrix undulata

Family Acrididae (grasshoppers) 
 Large marsh grasshopper Stethophyma grossum - rare and restricted to the New Forest and Dorset
 Stripe-winged grasshopper Stenobothrus lineatus
 Lesser mottled grasshopper Stenobothrus stigmaticus (Isle of Man only)
 Woodland grasshopper Omocestus rufipes
 Common green grasshopper Omocestus viridulus
 Field grasshopper Chorthippus brunneus
 Heath grasshopper Chorthippus vagans
 Lesser marsh grasshopper Chorthippus albomarginatus
 Meadow grasshopper Pseudochorthippus parallelus
 Rufous grasshopper Gomphocerippus rufus
 Mottled grasshopper Myrmeleotettix maculatus

Order Blattodea (cockroaches)

Family Blattellidae 

 Dusky cockroach Ectobius lapponicus
 Tawny cockroach Ectobius pallidus
 Lesser cockroach Capraiellus panzeri

Order Dermaptera (earwigs)

Family Spongiphoridae 

 Lesser earwig Labia minor

Family Forficulidae 

 Short-winged earwig Apterygida media
 Common earwig Forficula auricularia
 Lesne's earwig Forficula lesnei

References 

Orthoptera Britain
L